Var hälsad, sköna morgonstund is an 1819 Christmas hymn with lyrics by Johan Olof Wallin. It is set to a tune composed by Philipp Nicolai., There is also an English language-version called "All Hail to Thee, O Blessèd Morn!" with lyrics by Ernst W. Olson published in the Augustana Hymnal of 1901.

Publications
1819 års psalmbok as number 55 under the lines "Jesu kärleksfulla uppenbarelse i mänskligheten: Jesu födelse (julpsalmer)".
Stockholms söndagsskolförenings sångbok 1882 as number 87 under the lines "Psalmer" with the verses 1 and 4.
Sionstoner 1889 as number 446 under the lines "Psalmer", verses 1-4
Herde-Rösten 1892 as number 94 under the lines "Jul-sånger".
Svenska Missionsförbundets sångbok 1894 as number 32 under the lines "Jesu födelse".
Hjärtesånger 1895 as number 46 entitled "Julsång"
Musik till Frälsningsarméns sångbok 1907 as number 414
Svensk söndagsskolsångbok 1908 as number 22 under the lines "Julsånger"
Lilla Psalmisten 1909 as number 16 under the lines "Kristus: Hans födelse, död, uppståndelse."
Svenska Frälsningsarméns sångbok 1922 as number 25 under the lines "Högtider, Jul".
Svensk söndagsskolsångbok 1929 as number 37 under the lines "Advents- och julsånger"
Frälsningsarméns sångbok 1929 as number 543 under the lines "Högtider och särskilda tillfällen - Jul".
Svenska Missionsförbundets sångbok 1920 as number 82 under the lines "Jesu födelse"
Segertoner 1930 as number 104
Sionstoner 1935 as number 151 under the lines "Jul"
1937 års psalmbok as number 55 under the lines "Jul".
Förbundstoner 1957 as number 43 under the lines "Guds uppenbarelse i Kristus: Jesu födelse".
Segertoner 1960 as number 104
Psalmer för bruk vid krigsmakten 1961 as number 55 verses 1–4.
Frälsningsarméns sångbok 1968 as number 604 under the lines "Högtider - Jul".
Sionstoner 1972 as number 109
1986 års psalmbok as number 119 in 1986 års Cecilia-psalmbok, Psalmer och Sånger 1987, Segertoner 1988 and Frälsningsarméns sångbok 1990 under the lines "Jul".
Finlandssvenska psalmboken 1986 as number 27 under the lines "Jul".
Lova Herren 1988 as number 100 under the lines "Jul".
Julens önskesångbok, 1997, under the lines "Traditionella julsånger".
Barnens svenska sångbok, 1999, under the lines "Året runt".

References

1819 songs
Swedish Christmas songs
Swedish-language songs
Lutheran hymns
Songs about Jesus